Sentimentale may refer to:

"Sentimentale", French song by Marie Myriam  Yamaha Music Festival 1982 
"Sentimentale", Italian song by Mina from Mina (1971 album)
"Sentimentale", French song by Mylène Farmer from Désobéissance 2018